Mr. Robot is an American television series that premiered in 2015. It may also refer to:
 Mister Robot, 1959 manga by Shigeru Sugiura
 Mr. Robot and His Robot Factory, a 1984 video game by Datamost
 Mr. Robot (video game), a 2007 video game by Moonpod
 Mr. Robot:1.51exfiltrati0n a game by Night School Studio based on the series

See also

 Mr. Roboto (disambiguation)
 Robotman (disambiguation)
 Robot (disambiguation)